Acacia mulganeura, commonly known as milky mulga and hilltop mulga, is a tree or shrub belonging to the genus Acacia and the subgenus Juliflorae that is endemic to arid parts of central and western Australia.

Description
It has ribbed branchlets that are mostly covered in a layer of opaque, milky blue-grey or yellowish coloured resin that changed to beaded white lines as the branchlets mature. The resinous new shoots have reddish coloured hairlets embedded in the resin. Like most species of Acacia it has phyllodes rather than true leaves. The grey to blue grey to dull green variable phyllodes have an elliptic or obovate to oblanceolate shape and are usually somewhat twisted or slightly undulate.

Distribution
It is native to the Mid West, Pilbara and Goldfields-Esperance regions of Western Australia as well as southern parts of the Northern Territory and northern parts of South Australia where it is often situated on flats or undulating plains and on rocky hills growing in red-brown loamy, silty loamy, sandy loamy or clay-loam soils although it also less frequently found in clay often over hardpan or in skeletal soils as a part of mixed Eucalyptus shrubland communities that usually have a cover of spinifex.

See also
List of Acacia species

References

mulganeura
Acacias of Western Australia
Plants described in 2012
Taxa named by Bruce Maslin
Flora of the Northern Territory
Flora of South Australia